German submarine U-282 was a type VIIC U-boat of Nazi Germany's Kriegsmarine in World War II. She was built at the Bremer-Vegesacker yard in Bremen. She was laid down on 2 June 1942, launched on 3 February 1943 and commissioned on 13 March 1943 with Oberleutnant zur See Rudolf Müller in command.

The boat and crew commenced training with the 8th U-boat flotilla, moving on to the 9th flotilla for operations. The boat was sunk on its first war patrol by attacks from the destroyer  and the corvette  on 29 October 1943 in mid-Atlantic.

Design
German Type VIIC submarines were preceded by the shorter Type VIIB submarines. U-282 had a displacement of  when at the surface and  while submerged. She had two shafts and two  propellers.

U-282 was fitted with five  torpedo tubes (four fitted at the bow and one at the stern), fourteen torpedoes, one  SK C/35 naval gun, 220 rounds, and two twin  C/30 anti-aircraft guns. The boat had a complement of between forty-four and sixty.

References

Bibliography

External links

1943 ships
U-boats commissioned in 1943
Ships lost with all hands
U-boats sunk in 1943
U-boats sunk by depth charges
U-boats sunk by British warships
World War II shipwrecks in the Atlantic Ocean
Ships built in Bremen (state)
German Type VIIC submarines
World War II submarines of Germany
Maritime incidents in October 1943